A wire is a strand of drawn metal used especially in electrical conductors and fencing.

wire may also refer to:

Abbreviations 
Note: These terms are often shortened to simply wire, wires or wired.
 Wire, a covert listening device worn as a wire under a person's clothes
 Wire, an informal term for a telegraph, or the act of using a telegraph
 Wire service, a journalism-jargon term for news agency (a newswire or wire service)
 Wire tap, police jargon for covert telephone listening device
 Wire transfer, a method of sending money directly between banks

Types of wire 
 Barbed wire, steel fencing wire
 Chicken wire, a mesh of wire
 Concertina wire, a type of barbed wire or razor wire
 Copper-clad aluminium wire, inner aluminium core and outer copper cladding
 Electrical wiring, electrical installation of cabling and associated devices
 Electroluminescent wire, thin copper wire coated in a phosphor
 Glass-coated wire, fine glass-coated metal filaments
 Magnet wire, copper or aluminium wire coated with a very thin layer of insulation
 Nanowire, 1-D structures used in nanoelectronics and nanowire battery anodes 
 Razor wire
 Wire rope, twisted strands of metal wire
 Wire recording, audio storage on a thin steel wire

People
 Wíres (footballer) (born 1982), Brazilian football player
 Coy Wire (born 1978),  American footballer, television anchor, and correspondent
 Edith Wire (1899-1973), American composer, pianist, and writer; Lester’s sister
 Lester Wire (1887–1958), inventor, Edith’s brother
 Nicky Wire (born 1969), musician with the Welsh rock band Manic Street Preachers
 Kurt Wires (1919–1992), sprint canoer

Arts, entertainment, and media

Fictional entities
 Monomolecular wire, a fictional type of wire used as a weapon to cut and sever objects

Music

Groups
 Wire (band), British punk/post-punk group (1976–present)

Albums
 Wire (Third Day album), a 2004 album by Third Day
 Wire (Wire album), a 2015 album by Wire
 Wires (album), a 2001 album by Art of Fighting

Songs
 "Wires" (song), by Athlete, 2004
 "The Wire" (David Dallas song), featuring Ruby Frost, 2013 
 "The Wire" (Haim song), 2013
 "Wire", a song by U2 from their 1984 album The Unforgettable Fire
 "Wire", by Third Day from the album Wire, 2004
 "Wires", by Red Fang from the album Murder the Mountains, 2011
 "Wires", by The Neighbourhood, 2012

News sites
The Wire (India), an Indian news website
The Wire, a defunct website published by The Atlantic

Radio
 WIRE (FM), a radio station at 91.1 FM licensed to Lebanon, Indiana
 The Wire (radio program), an Australian current-affairs program
 The Wire, Gaylord College of Journalism and Mass Communication's student radio station
 WXNT, an Indianapolis, Indiana (1430 AM) radio station, which held the WIRE call sign from 1935 to 1989

Television

Channels
 Wire TV, a 1992–1995 UK cable television channel
 WIRE-CD, a television station (channel 33, virtual 33) licensed to serve Atlanta, Georgia, United States

Series
 The Wire, a 2002–2008 HBO police drama TV series

Episodes
 "The Wire" (Curb Your Enthusiasm), the sixth episode of Curb  Your Enthusiasm
 "The Wire" (The Wire episode), the sixth episode of The Wire TV series
 "The Wire" (Star Trek: Deep Space Nine), an episode of Star  Trek: Deep Space Nine

Other uses in arts, entertainment, and media
 The Wire (magazine), cover title Wire, a British music magazine, founded in 1982
 The Wire (JTF-GTMO), official weekly newspaper of Joint Task Force Guantanamo

Computing and telecommunications
 Wire (software), an instant messaging application that supports voice and video calling
 Wide-coverage Internet Repeater Enhancement System (WIRES), a digital transmission mode used in Yaesu amateur radio equipment
 Wire data, data on the wire in a communications system or protocol
 Wire protocol, a method of transmitting data
 Wire Swiss, a software company headquartered in Switzerland that is best known for its messaging application of the same name

Organizations 
 NSW Wildlife Information Rescue and Education Service (WIRES), an animal welfare organisation in New South Wales, Australia
 The WIRE project, a charitable organisation in England

Other uses 
 Warrington Wolves, a British rugby league team nicknamed The Wire
 Wide Field Infrared Explorer (WIRE), a spacecraft intended to produce an infrared survey of the entire sky
 Winged Reusable Sounding rocket (WIRES), by Japan
 Wire Building, listed on the National Register of Historic Places in Washington, D.C.
 Wire of Death or "the Wire", a lethal electric fence on the Dutch-Belgian border during World War I
 "The wire", an elaborate obsolete con used in the film The Sting

See also
 Wired (disambiguation)
 Barb wire (disambiguation)
 Barbed Wire (disambiguation)
 Endless Wire (disambiguation)
 Guide wire (disambiguation)
 High Wire (disambiguation)
 Wyre (disambiguation)